Louise Marie Jeanne Henriette de Bettignies (15 July 1880 - 27 September 1918) was a French secret agent who spied on the Germans for the British during World War I using the pseudonym of Alice Dubois. 

She was arrested in October 1915 and imprisoned, dying shortly before the end of the war in captivity. 

She was posthumously awarded the Cross of the Legion of Honour, the Croix de guerre 1914-1918  with palm, and the British Military Medal, and she was made an Officer of the Order of the British Empire.

Family
Traces of the Bettignies family date back to 1228. The Lordship of Bettignies was located near the city of Mons in what is now Belgium. There are further traces of the family in 1507.

Peterinck de La Gohelle, de Bettignies’ great-grandfather, originated in Lille.
He settled in Tournai in 1752, where he founded a factory of porcelain art on the quai des Salines.
The factory was called the imperial and royal factory.
In 1787, the Duke of Orleans ordered a magnificent service in blue decor from Tournai of which some pieces are held in the Musée royal de Mariemont.

In 1818, Maximilen Joseph de Bettignies, advocate to the council of Tournai, General Counsel and magistrate, opened a depot at rue du Wacq in Saint-Amand-les-Eaux, 
which he gave to his son Maximilian.

On 31 July 1818 M.J. de Bettignies filed a patent No. 521 on the paste with which to make large vases of bone china (Brev. d'inv., volume XVI, p. 276).

Tariffs were high, and the deposit became a factory after it had taken over the supply of material for the porcelain maker Fauquez, which he improved.
First installed in rue Marion, the factory in 1837 was established at a place called Le Moulin des Loups, on the road to Valenciennes. 
In 1831, Maximilian Joseph obtained the French nationality. 
In 1833, he married, in Orchies, Adeline Armande Bocquet, who bore him four children, one of whom was Henri, Louise de Bettignies's father.

In 1866, Henri de Bettignies married Julienne Mabille de Poncheville, from an old family of lawyers in the northern France.

The Mabille family had its origins in the Pas-de-Calais and for several generations had notaries in Valenciennes.

On 30 June 1880, Henry and Maximilian de Bettignies ceded their business to Gustave Dubois and Léandre Bouquiaux.

Education and family
Despite her father's financial difficulties, de Bettignies obtained a secondary education in Valenciennes with the Sisters of the Sacred Heart.
According to her cousin,

According to Laure Marie Mabille de Poncheville, 

Her parents moved in Lille in 1895, but she left in 1898 for England to continue her higher studies with the Ursulines at Upton, Essex, and then with the Ursulines at Wimbledon and Oxford.

After the death of her father in 1903, she returned to Lille, where she graduated in the Faculty of Letters of the University of Lille in 1906.
After her studies, she had a perfect mastery of English and a good knowledge of German and Italian.

Early career
She worked as a tutor in Pierrefonds, Oise, and went to Milan, Italy, to the home of Giuseppe Visconti de Modrone.
In 1906, when she was with the Viscontis, she travelled extensively throughout Italy. 
In 1911, she went to Count Mikiewsky, near Lemberg (Lviv), in Galicia. From 1911 to 1912, she was with Prince Carl Schwarzenberg, at the Orlík Castle.

She then moved to the Princess Elvira of Bavaria, at the Holeschau Castle, Austria-Hungary (now Moravia, Czech Republic). She is supposed to have met Rupprecht of Bavaria during her trip in 1915.
It was there that she was offered the position of tutor of the children of Ferdinand Joseph, the heir to the Austro-Hungarian throne. 
She declined the offer and returned to France.

Back in Lille in early 1914, where she was operated on for appendicitis, she went to her brother's home in Bully-les-Mines.

At the outbreak of the war, Louise lived in a villa at Wissant that was rented by her brother Albert.

World War I

Before August was over, Louise left Wissant and returned to Saint-Omer. From there, she took the pretext of joining her sister Germaine, whose husband, Maurice Houzet was mobilized, to go to Lille.

Context in Lille

On 1 August 1914, Adolphe Messimy, Minister of War, suppressed, with the approval of René Viviani, President of the Council, the position of governor of Lille. 
He had exceeded his rights, as the decommissioning should have been enacted by law. 
Lille was then declared an "open city" (its fortifications were decommissioned in 1910) and the staff was evacuated on 24 August.
On 22 August, after German patrols were seen in the vicinity of Lille, General Percin installed a 75 mm gun in front of each drawbridge of the Citadel. 
This initiative provoked the wrath of Charles Delesalle, the mayor, and of advocates of non-defense. 
Faced with this, Pervin retreated. Behind the back of the prefect, the supporters of non-defense created new initiatives to disarm the city. 
On August 24, the Staff evacuated Lille.

During this turbulent period, the government yielded to fear. 
The prefect Felix Trepont was ordered to retreat with the administrative and postal services to Dunkirk. 
Then a few days later, he was given a counter-order. 
Upon his return, the prefect found the offices of military buildings open to all the winds and the equipment abandoned. 
On 27 August Trepont asked John Vandenbosch, an industrialist, to move all military equipment to Dunkirk. Transport lasted for 21 days, and 278 trains were needed.
On 2 September, the Germans entered the city, then departed after extorting ransom. 
They returned several times. On 4 October, a detachment of Wahnschaffe stumbled on a battalion of Chasseurs on foot, resting in the city. 
Taken aback, they retreated, burning some houses in the suburb of Fives.

Lille was invaded by a crowd of refugees. Until October 9, there was confusion in both prefecture and in the city.

On October 9, the commander Felix de Pardieu and his territorials were ordered to retreat in the region of Neuve-Chapelle, leaving Lille without defender. 
General Ferdinand Foch, who arrived on the night of 4 to 5 October, warned by the prefect, sent commander Pardieu back towards Lille under the protection of the 20th Regiment of mounted chasseurs. 
Delayed by the crowd, the ammunition convoy was attacked by a detachment of General Georg von der Marwitz. 
Tired of waiting for the start of the British offensive, Foch dispatched the cavalry corps of commander Conneau to Lille.
On the stroke of noon on 12 October, Lille heard the gunfire coming closer. The corps of Conneau engaged in a famous battle, but did not persist, believing that Lille had succumbed. Surrounding the city, the Germans had between 50,000 and 80,000 men, facing a motley band of 2,795 men composed of chasseurs, goumiers and especially territorials, armed with a battery of artillery, with three 75mm guns and little ammunition.

Under fire

Louise and Germaine lived together at 166 rue d'Isly.

From 4 to 13 October 1914, by turning the only cannon that the Lille troops had, the defenders succeeded in deceiving the enemy and holding them for several days under an intense battle that destroyed more than 2,200 buildings and houses, particularly in the area of the station. 
Louise, moving through the ruins of Lille, ensured the supply of ammunition and food to the soldiers who were still firing on the attackers. 
In makeshift hospitals, she wrote letters in German dictated by dying Germans to their families.

Espionage service: the Alice Network

After the German army invaded Lille in October 1914, de Bettignies began carrying messages from people who were trapped there to and from their relatives in unoccupied France. She did this by writing them in lemon juice on a petticoat. Once at her destination, she ironed the petticoat to make the messages visible and cut them apart for delivery. Impressed by her cleverness and her language skills, officers of both the French and English intelligence agencies tried to recruit her. She decided to work for the British, who gave her the pseudonym Alice Dubois and helped her set up an intelligence network of some one hundred people. 

The Alice Network provided important information to the British by way of occupied Belgium and the Netherlands. It is estimated that the network saved the lives of more than a thousand British soldiers during its 9 months of full operation from January to September 1915.

The network, which operated within forty kilometers of the front to the west and east of Lille, was so effective that she was nicknamed by her English superiors "the queen of spies." Starting in spring 1915, de Bettignies worked closely with Marie Léonie Vanhoutte, alias Charlotte Lameron.

De Bettignies smuggled men to England, provided valuable information to the Intelligence Service, and prepared for her superiors in London a grid map of the region around Lille. When the German army installed a new battery of artillery, the intelligence she provided allowed this camouflaged position to be bombed by the Royal Flying Corps within eight days.

Another opportunity allowed her to report the date and time of passage of the imperial train carrying the Kaiser on a secret visit to the front at Lille. 
During the approach to Lille, two British aircraft bombed the train and emerged, but missed their target. 
The German command did not understand the unique situation of these forty kilometers of "cursed" front (held by the British) out of nearly seven hundred miles of front.
 
One of her last messages announced the preparation of a massive German attack on Verdun in early 1916. The information was relayed to the French commander, but unfortunately, he refused to believe it.

Arrested by the Germans on 20 October 1915 near Tournai, she was sentenced to death on 16 March 1916 in Brussels. Her sentence was later commuted to forced labor for life. After being held for three years, she died on 27 September 1918 as a result of pleural abscesses poorly operated upon at St. Mary's Hospital in Cologne.

Her body was repatriated on 21 February 1920. On 16 March 1920 a funeral was held in Lille in which she was posthumously awarded the Cross of the Legion of Honor, the Croix de guerre 1914-1918 with palm, and the British Military Medal, and she was made an Officer of the Order of the British Empire. 
She is buried in the cemetery of Saint-Amand-les-Eaux.

Tributes 

 In Lille, there is a monument to Louise de Bettignies that includes a statue of her with a soldier kneeling and kissing her hand.

 In 2008, a small museum was established in her birthplace, rue Louise de Bettignies (formerly Rue de Conde) in Saint-Amand-les-Eaux. As of October 2021, a large portrait of de Bettignies was scheduled to be finished on the outside of the building, which was being converted to a resource center devoted to the emancipation of women.
 
 Several French towns have named streets, schools and other structures after her, for example, the school where Françoise Sagan studied (and was expelled from).

 De Bettignies is a secondary character in Kate Quinn's book The Alice Network, published in 2017.

References

Notes

Sources 

 

  (2nd edition 1946)

Further reading 
 Hélène d’Argœuvres, Louise de Bettignies, Plon, 1937 et La Colombe, 1956.

External links

 Louise de Bettignies sur le site officiel chemins de mémoire.
 Louise de Bettignies sur le site officiel Chemins de mémoire de la Grande guerre en Nord-Pas de Calais.
 beh.free.fr
 Monument en l’honneur de Louise de Bettignies.
 Louise de Bettignies, avec arbre généalogique.
 De Bettignies Louise (1880 - 1918) écrit par Bertin de Bettignies, petit fils d'Albert de Bettignies, frère de Louise de Bettignies.
 Antier, Chantal: Bettignies, Louise Marie Jeanne Henriette de, in: 1914-1918-online. International Encyclopedia of the First World War.

1880 births
1918 deaths
People from Nord (French department)
French spies
French people of World War I
World War I spies for the United Kingdom
French people of Belgian descent